Kozlovo is an urban locality (an urban-type settlement) in Konakovsky District of Tver Oblast, Russia, located close the right bank of the Shosha River (the Ivankovo Reservoir).  Population:

History
The village of Kozlovo was first mentioned in the 16th century. After 1781, it belonged to Klinsky Uyezd of Moscow Governorate. In 1857, a carpet factory was open by merchant Flanden. The factory served for a long time as the main employer in Kozlovo.

On July 12 1929, Moscow Governorate was abolished, and the area was transferred to Moscow Oblast. Uyezds were abolished as well, and Zavidovsky District, with the administrative center in Novozavidovsky, was established within Tver Okrug of Moscow Oblast.  Kozlovo was included into Zavidovsky District. On July 23, 1930, the okrugs were abolished, and the districts were directly subordinated to the oblast. On January 29, 1935 Kalinin Oblast was established, and Zavidovsky District was transferred to Kalinin Oblast. In November and December 1941, during World War II, Kozlovo was occupied by German troops. In 1958, Kozlovo was granted urban-type settlement status. On November 14, 1960 the district was abolished and merged into Konakovsky District. On February 13, 1963, during the abortive Khrushchyov administrative reform, Konakovsky District was merged into Kalininsky District, but on January  12, 1965 it was re-established. In 1990, Kalinin Oblast was renamed Tver Oblast.

Economy
Kozlovo is one of the gateways to Zavidovo nature reserve, a closed area which is only accessible to high-level state employees. The headquarters of the nature reserve are located in Kozlovo, and it is by far the main employer.

Industry

There are two textile factories in the settlement.

Transportation
The closest railway station is Zavidovo in the settlement of Novozavidovsky, at the Moscow – Saint Petersburg Railway. It belongs to the Leningradsky suburban railway linew and is connected by regular passenger suburban service with both Moscow (Moscow Leningradsky railway station) and Tver.

Kozlovo has a road access via Novozavidovsky to the M10 highway, which connects Moscow and St. Petersburg. In the opposite direction, it is connected to Tver via Turginovo.

Culture and recreation

Kozlovo contains two cultural heritage monuments of local significance. They are the Church of the Nativity of John the Baptist, constructed in 1880, and a monument to the soldiers fallen in World War II.

References

Notes

Sources

Urban-type settlements in Tver Oblast
Klinsky Uyezd